Canchy may refer to the following places in France:

Canchy, Calvados, in the Calvados département 
Canchy, Somme, in the Somme département